Lawrence Mahlon Coombs (born August 9, 1957) is a former American football guard who played for the New Orleans Saints in 1980. He played college football at University of Idaho.

References 

1957 births
Living people
American football offensive guards
Idaho Vandals football players
New Orleans Saints players
People from Arcata, California
Players of American football from California